Rucentra celebensis is a species of beetle in the family Cerambycidae. It was described by Breuning in 1943. It is known from Celebes.

References

Apomecynini
Beetles described in 1943